Pleasant Valley   is a community located in Pictou County in Nova Scotia, Canada.

References
Pleasant Valley on Destination Nova Scotia

Communities in Pictou County
General Service Areas in Nova Scotia